Lachancea thermotolerans is a species of yeast.

Taxonomy
L. thermotolerans is the type species of the genus Lachancea. The species has previously been known as Kluyveromyces thermotolerans and Zygosaccharomyces thermotolerans, which is the name by which it was first described in 1932.

Habitat and ecology
L. thermotolerans is widely distributed and occurs in diverse environments, both natural and man-made. It has been isolated from locations around the world. The species is commonly associated with fruit and with insects such as fruit flies that feed on fruit. In some cases, it has been identified as one of several species found in naturally fermented foods.

Uses
L. thermotolerans is unusual among yeasts in its ability to produce lactic acid through fermentation. This property has prompted study of L. thermotolerans in the production of wine and beer, both of which are traditionally produced using Saccharomyces yeasts. In winemaking, L. thermotolerans and other yeast species have been studied for the effects of their metabolites on the flavor profile of wines. Systems including L. thermotolerans in co-fermentation with wine yeast or in place of lactic acid bacteria have been described as an alternative to traditional malolactic fermentation. L. thermotolerans has been sold commercially on its own and in a yeast blend. In beer brewing, L. thermotolerans has been considered as a method for producing sour beer. It has been observed that this kind of yeast ferments at low temperatures (17 °C) as well as at high temperatures (27 °C) and with SO2 doses of 25 mg/L and 75 mg/L with an ethanol yield between 7-11% vol. Sequential inoculations (binary) and sequential co-inoculations (ternary) with different non-Saccharomyces, including L. thermotolerans, have also been studied, resulting in very significant synergies and inhibitions in lactic acid production.

References

Yeasts
Fungi described in 2003
Wine chemistry
Yeasts used in brewing